Togo has sent athletes to every Summer Olympic Games held since 1972 except for 1976 and 1980, which they boycotted, winning their first Olympic medal at the 2008 Summer Olympics when Benjamin Boukpeti won bronze in the K1 kayak slalom event.

Togo made its Winter Olympics debut at Sochi in 2014, where it sent two skiers to compete. Cross-country skier and Togolese flagbearer Mathilde-Amivi Petitjean was born in Togo to a Togolese mother and raised in France, while alpine skier Alessia Afi Dipol is an Italian-born Togolese citizen.

Medal tables

Medals by Summer Games

Medals by Winter Games

Medals by sport

List of medalists

See also
 List of flag bearers for Togo at the Olympics
 Tropical nations at the Winter Olympics

References

External links